The elegant moray (Gymnothorax elegans), or Goldsborough's moray eel, is a moray eel found in coral reefs in the Pacific and Indian Oceans. It was first named by Bliss in 1883.

References 

elegans
Fish described in 1883